Judith Ann Wilson Rogers (born July 27, 1939), is a Senior United States circuit judge of the United States Court of Appeals for the District of Columbia Circuit.

Education and career
Judith Ann Wilson was born on July 27, 1939 in New York City. Her father is noted architect John Louis Wilson Jr., known for his work in designing public buildings in New York City.

Rogers received an Artium Baccalaureus degree from Radcliffe College in 1961; a Bachelor of Laws from Harvard Law School in 1964; and a Master of Laws from the University of Virginia School of Law in 1988. 

After graduating from law school, she was a law clerk at the Juvenile Court of the District of Columbia from 1964 to 1965. She then worked as an Assistant United States Attorney for the District of Columbia from 1965 to 1968, a staff attorney at San Francisco Neighborhood Legal Assistance Foundation from 1968 to 1969, and a trial attorney at the United States Department of Justice Criminal Division from 1969 to 1971. From 1971 to 1972, she was General Counsel for the Congressional Commission on the Organization of the District Government, where she helped develop home rule legislation for the District of Columbia. She worked on legislative affairs in the District government from 1972 to 1979, a period in which the District held its first elections for city council and mayor under the new District of Columbia Home Rule Act. In 1979, Rogers became the first female corporation counsel for the District of Columbia.

In 1983, Rogers became an Associate Judge of the District of Columbia Court of Appeals, the highest court for the District of Columbia. She served as Chief Judge of that court from 1988 to 1994.

Federal judicial service
Rogers was nominated by President Bill Clinton on November 17, 1993, to a seat on the United States Court of Appeals for the District of Columbia Circuit vacated by Judge Clarence Thomas. She was confirmed by the United States Senate on March 10, 1994. She received her commission on March 11, 1994. She became the fourth woman to be appointed to the court. On June 3, 2022, she announced her intent to assume senior status upon confirmation of a successor. She assumed senior status on September 1, 2022.

In March 2017, Rogers argued the First Amendment provides the public a qualified right to access prisoners' court filings when the court, unanimous in judgment but in divided opinions, found that the press could not access classified video of Jihad Ahmed Mustafa Dhiab being force fed during the Guantanamo Bay hunger strikes.

In August 2017, Rogers partially dissented when the court found that mandatory minimum sentences as applied to the Nisour Square massacre killers were unconstitutional cruel and unusual punishments.

In February 2020, Rogers dissented when the majority held that the United States House Committee on the Judiciary could not enforce a subpoena upon President Trump's former White House Counsel, Don McGahn.

On November 12, 2021, Rogers wrote for the unanimous panel in allowing the USPS regulator to set higher mail rates.

See also 
 List of African-American federal judges
 List of African-American jurists
 List of first women lawyers and judges in Washington D.C. (Federal District)

References

External links

American Bar Association profile

|-

|-

|-

1939 births
Living people
20th-century American judges
20th-century American women judges
21st-century American judges
21st-century American women judges
African-American judges
Assistant United States Attorneys
Harvard Law School alumni
Judges of the District of Columbia Court of Appeals
Judges of the United States Court of Appeals for the D.C. Circuit
Lawyers from New York City
Radcliffe College alumni
United States court of appeals judges appointed by Bill Clinton
University of Virginia School of Law alumni